The 2021 Indian Women's League season was to be the fifth season of the Indian Women's League, the top division women's professional football league in India. The final round was scheduled to start from 21 April 2021 in Odisha but was later postponed due 2nd wave of COVID-19 pandemic in India.

The AFC (Asian Football Confederation) announced that the winners of the 2020-21 IWL will get to feature in the 2021 edition of AFC Women's Club Championship, the premier women's club tournament of Asia.

Teams
Leagues organized by the state federations acted as preliminary qualifiers.

Qualifying playoffs

Group A

Schedule

Group B

Schedule

Group C

Schedule

Round 2

References

External links
Hero IWL

Indian Women's League
2020–21 domestic women's association football leagues
Sports competitions in Odisha
Ind
1